Agh Bolagh (also Romanized as Āgh Bolāgh; also known as Āqbolāgh and Āq Bolāgh) is a village in Kuhsar Rural District, in the Central District of Hashtrud County, East Azerbaijan Province, Iran. At the 2006 census, its population was 435, in 95 families.

References 

Towns and villages in Hashtrud County